The 1961 Scottish League Cup final was played on 28 October 1961 and replayed on 18 December 1961. Both matches were played at Hampden Park in Glasgow and it was the final of the 16th Scottish League Cup competition. The final was contested by Rangers and Heart of Midlothian. The first match ended in a 1–1 draw, necessitating the replay. Rangers won the replay match 3–1, thanks to goals by Ralph Brand, Ian McMillan and Jimmy Millar.

Match details

Replay

External links
 Soccerbase – first match
 Soccerbase – replay
 London Hearts – first match
 London Hearts – replay

1961
League Cup Final
Scottish League Cup Final 1961
Scottish League Cup Final 1961
1960s in Glasgow
October 1961 sports events in the United Kingdom
December 1961 sports events in the United Kingdom